Mojmírovce is a village and municipality in the Nitra District in western central Slovakia, in the Nitra Region.

History
In historical records the village was first mentioned in 1156.

Geography
The village lies at an altitude of 140 metres and covers an area of 19.863 km². It has a population of about 2740 people.

Ethnicity
The village is approximately 98% Slovak and 2% Hungarian.

Facilities
The village has a public library, a gym, a church, an art exhibit, and a DVD rental store.

Famous people
 Vilmos Fraknói, historian, secretary of HAS, titular bishop, canon of Várad

References

External links
http://www.mojmirovce.sk
http://www.statistics.sk/mosmis/eng/run.html

Villages and municipalities in Nitra District